Under Construction may refer to:

Under Construction, a sign noting construction is taking place
Under Construction (Gentle Giant album), 1997
Under Construction (Missy Elliott album), 2002
Under Construction (Schugar/Schenker album), 2003
Under Construction, Part II, a 2003 album by Timbaland & Magoo
Under Construction (film), a 2015 Bengali film
Under Construction, an early name of the band Prism
Under Construction, a sub-label of British independent record label Breakbeat Kaos